Goat Island Light is a lighthouse located off Cape Porpoise near Kennebunkport in southern Maine. Goat Island Light was established in 1835 to guard the entrance to Cape Porpoise Harbor. The original station was upgraded in 1859 to the current brick tower with a fifth order Fresnel lens. Keeper's quarters were added to the island in 1860. The light station was automated by the United States Coast Guard in 1990 and is currently active. The keepers dwellings and tower are leased to the Kennebunkport Conservation Trust.  Goat Island Light can be seen from shore in Cape Porpoise Harbor just off State Route 9 north of Kennebunkport or is viewable by boat. The island is currently closed to the public except by special arrangement.

Description and history
The coast of southern Maine east of the Kennebunk River is studded with a group of small islands and rock ledges near the headland called Cape Porpoise. The lighthouse is set on the island's southern shore, with the keeper's house a short way to its north. A boathouse and dock stand and the western end of the island, with a small brick oil house between it and the tower.

The lantern house presently houses a fifth order Fresnel lens. A metal walkway and railing surround the lantern house, and there is a single window in the tower. A small workroom with two doors projects from the tower. The keeper's house is an L-shaped wood-frame structure,  stories in height, with clapboard siding replacing its original board-and-batten siding. The roof is pierced by dormers, also a later alteration. It was originally joined to the tower by a covered walkway. The boathouse is a simple rectangular single-story structure with a gable roof and clapboard siding. The oil house is a small brick structure with a gable roof that has a vent at one end.

Goat Island Light was authorized in 1833 as an aid to navigation for reaching the harbor at Cape Porpoise. The boathouse was built in 1905.

See also

National Register of Historic Places listings in York County, Maine

References

Lighthouses completed in 1859
Lighthouses on the National Register of Historic Places in Maine
Lighthouses in York County, Maine
Historic districts on the National Register of Historic Places in Maine
National Register of Historic Places in York County, Maine